Pertate is a village in the municipality of Lebane, Serbia. According to the 2020 census, the village has a population of 2210 people.

Notable residents
Lazar Ranđelović, born 1997, footballer

References

Populated places in Jablanica District